The 2002 Croatian Bol Ladies Open was a women's tennis tournament played on outdoor clay courts in Bol, Croatia and was part of the Tier III category of the 2002 WTA Tour. It was the ninth edition of the tournament and was held from 29 April until 5 May 2002. Unseeded Åsa Svensson won the singles title and earned $27,000 first-prize money.

Finals

Singles

 Åsa Svensson defeated  Iva Majoli 6–3, 4–6, 6–1
 It was Svensson's 1st singles title of the year and the 2nd of her career.

Doubles

 Tathiana Garbin /  Angelique Widjaja defeated  Elena Bovina /  Henrieta Nagyová 7–5, 3–6, 6–4

See also
 2002 Croatia Open

External links
 ITF tournament draws
 Tournament draws

Croatian Bol Ladies Open
Croatian Bol Ladies Open
2002 in Croatian tennis
2002 in Croatian women's sport